Lazarus Mokoena (born 30 July 1990) is a South African cricketer. He made his first-class debut for Gauteng in the 2014–15 Sunfoil 3-Day Cup on 22 January 2015.

References

External links
 

1990 births
Living people
South African cricketers
Gauteng cricketers
Cricketers from Johannesburg